Anion exchange protein 3 is a membrane transport protein that in humans is encoded by the SLC4A3 gene. AE3 is functionally similar to the Band 3 Cl−/HCO3− exchange protein but it is expressed primarily in brain neurons and in the heart. Like AE2 its activity is sensitive to pH. AE3 mutations have been linked to seizures.

See also
 Solute carrier family

References

Further reading

Solute carrier family